Ghislain Harvey (born May 6, 1946 in Bagotville, Quebec) was a member of the Quebec Provincial Parliament from 1973 to 1976.

In the 1973 Quebec general election, Harvey was a candidate for the Liberal Party of Quebec in Dubuc and defeated Parti Québécois candidate André Desgagné and Union Nationale incumbent Roch Boivin. In 1976, PQ candidate Hubert Desbiens defeated Harvey.

Harvey is currently the Executive Vice President and General Manager of Promotion Saguenay Inc. From 1977 to 2002, he successively occupied the position of Head of Municipal Administration for La Baie, Chicoutimi and Saguenay.

He has a Bachelor of Human Sciences degree from l’Université du Québec à Chicoutimi and he is a member of the Order of Chartered Human Resources and Industrial Relations Advisors of Quebec. Mr. Harvey was appointed to the Royal Canadian Mint’s Board of Directors on October 21, 2003.

References

External links
 

1946 births
French Quebecers
Living people
Quebec Liberal Party MNAs
Université du Québec à Chicoutimi alumni
Politicians from Saguenay, Quebec